The Battery "L" 1st Michigan Light Artillery Regiment was an artillery battery that served in the Union Army during the American Civil War.

Service
Battery "L"  was organized at Coldwater, Michigan and mustered into service on April 11, 1863.

The battery was mustered out on August 22, 1865.

Total strength and casualties
Over its existence, the battery carried a total of 209 men on its muster rolls.

The battery endured 29 fatalities; one soldier killed in action and one officer and 27 enlisted men who died of disease.

Commanders
Captain Charles J. Thompson

See also
List of Michigan Civil War units
Michigan in the American Civil War

Notes

References
The Civil War Archive

Artillery
1865 disestablishments in Michigan
Artillery units and formations of the American Civil War
1863 establishments in Michigan
Military units and formations established in 1863
Military units and formations disestablished in 1865